"Run Away Little Tears" is a single by American country music artist Connie Smith.  Released in April 1968, the song reached #10 on the Billboard Hot Country Singles chart.  The single was later released on Smith's 1968 album entitled I Love Charley Brown. The single also reached #18 on the Canadian RPM Country Tracks chart in 1968, becoming her second single to chart in Canada.

Chart performance

References

1968 singles
Connie Smith songs
Songs written by Dallas Frazier
Song recordings produced by Bob Ferguson (musician)
1968 songs
RCA Victor singles